Krasko (Russian or Ukrainian: Краско or Красько) is a gender-neutral Ukrainian surname that may refer to

Andrey Krasko (1957–2006), Russian theatre and cinema actor
Olga Krasko (born 1981), Russian actress
Ivan I. Krasko (born 1930), Russian film and theater actor, father of Andrey
Ivan Krasko (1876–1958), Slovak poet and translator
Julia Krasko (born 1971), Russian violinist 
Viktor Krasko (born 1953), Soviet swimmer
Vyacheslav Krasko (born 1974), Russian traveler, manager and financier

See also
 

Ukrainian-language surnames